Baykalovsky District is an administrative district (raion), one of the thirty in Sverdlovsk Oblast, Russia. As a municipal division, it is incorporated as Baykalovsky Municipal District. Its administrative center is the rural locality (a selo) of Baykalovo. Population: 16,294 (2010 Census);  The population of Baykalovo accounts for 35.5% of the district's total population.

References

Notes

Sources

Districts of Sverdlovsk Oblast